WPHI-FM (103.9 MHz) is a commercial radio station licensed to Jenkintown, Pennsylvania, and serving the Philadelphia metropolitan area. The station is owned by Audacy, Inc., simulcasting an all-news radio format with co-owned KYW 1060 AM.  The radio studios are in Audacy's corporate headquarters in Center City, Philadelphia.

WPHI-FM has an effective radiated power (ERP) of 270 watts, as a Class A station.  The transmitter tower is in the Roxborough neighborhood of Philadelphia. The station is short-spaced due to adjacent channel interference from WMGM in Atlantic City, WXCY-FM in Havre de Grace, Maryland, and WNNJ in Newton, New Jersey (all located on 103.7 FM) and WAEB-FM in Allentown and WNNK in Harrisburg (both located on 104.1 FM).

History

1960-1992: Early years
On , the station signed on the air.  Its original call sign was WIBF-FM and it was owned by Fox Broadcasting, not related to the more recent Fox Broadcasting Company television network. The call letters stood for the station's owners, brothers William and Irwin Fox and their father Benjamin Fox, a local real estate developer.

In the 1960s and 1970s, the station featured a format of MOR, big bands, Dixieland jazz and the area's first FM country music show, plus religious and ethnic programs.  By the mid-1970s, the station switched to Christian radio and ethnic programming during the day and Spanish-language tropical music at night. The Barry Reisman Show, featuring Jewish music and talk, was broadcast during the afternoon drive time from 1969 through the station's sale in 1992.  In 1965, the station picked up a television sister in WIBF-TV, channel 29 (now WTXF-TV, a station coincidentally owned by the Fox Broadcasting Company).

1992-1997: Modern rock
 

The station was sold by the Fox family in October 1992 to Jarad Broadcasting.  On November 9, 1992, at midnight, co-owned WDRE from Garden City, New York, started simulcasting its modern rock programming with WIBF-FM.  WIBF's branding was changed to "103.9 WDRE" to match the New York station. The simulcasting was part of a large effort by Jarad called "The Underground Network", a group of seven stations from across the country simulcasting WDRE. In 1995, the network ceased operations.  WDRE in New York changed its call letters back to WLIR.  That made WIBF-FM in Philadelphia an independent, local modern rock station.  WIBF-FM then changed its own call sign to WDRE - "We DaRE to be Different" - to match its branding.

WDRE used the slogan "Philly's Modern Rock". "Alive" by Pearl Jam was the first song played on WDRE.

The station helped launch the careers of several famous disc jockeys and broadcasters.  They include Preston Elliot and Steve Morrison of the Preston and Steve morning show on WMMR, Bret Hamilton of WCAU-TV, Marilyn Russell (formerly of Y100, WXPN, WMGK, now on WOGL), Jim McGuinn (also known as Rumor Boy), the former Program Director of WPLY, and Mel "Toxic" Taylor, who went on to WYSP. Taylor (formerly of WPST and WIFI) was the first DJ hired for the only two shows that were live from Philadelphia each week.

When WDRE Philadelphia became a local radio station in 1995, talent was hired from within the city (e.g. Bret Hamilton, formerly of WIOQ) and outside of the city.  While WDRE never became a true mainstream radio station in the Philadelphia radio market due to its weak signal, the station gained a cult status.  As a result, events like the station's music festival (known as "DREfest") sold out to a crowd of over 25,000 people.

In December 1996, Radio One bought WDRE from Jarad, and on the 16th of that month, WDRE announced that the station would flip to a then-undisclosed format in February 1997.

With the pending format flip, the staff at WDRE organized a concert called "Bitterfest", which was to be held at The Electric Factory.  The concert featured local acts G Love and the Fun Lovin' Criminals, and was created to celebrate the life of WDRE as a local institution for modern rock.  On February 7, 1997, "Bitterfest" was held to a sold-out crowd of over 3,000 people, with all of the WDRE staff present at the event.  At midnight on February 8, 1997, as the crowd at "Bitterfest" chanted "'D-R-E! 'D-R-E! 'D-R-E!", a lucky (or unlucky) listener was selected to "pull the plug" on WDRE, with the station ending with the first song that started the format: Pearl Jam's "Alive". Two of the WDRE disc jockeys (Preston Eliot, Bret Hamilton) went to Y100, as did 'DRE Program Director Jim McGuinn, and midday and Sunday night DJ Marilyn Russell (as Promotions Director for Y100). Y100 was also bought out by Radio One in 2000, and flipped in 2005 to urban contemporary.

1997-2005: Urban contemporary
On February 10, 1997, after a weekend of stunting with classic soul music, the station flipped to urban contemporary, branded as "Philly 103-9." The call letters were soon changed to WPHI. When the station rebranded as "The Beat" in April 2002, it shifted to rhythmic top 40. By 2006, Radio & Records/Nielsen BDS moved it to the urban contemporary panel.  Mediabase followed suit in 2011, completing the rhythmic to urban shift.

2005-2016: Gospel

On February 27, 2005, Radio One moved the "Beat" format to the 100.3 frequency, which was formerly Y100. 103.9 then flipped to urban gospel, branded as "Praise 103.9". The call sign was changed to WPPZ-FM on March 3.

Except for "The Yolanda Adams Morning Show" and CeCe McGhee weekday afternoons, the station ran without DJs throughout the day until August 2007. In late August, the addition of performer Lonnie Hunter from Chicago was named the midday personality along with Sheik Meah.  Motivational speaker Les Brown was added on Sundays from 7–9pm. In September, Pastor Alan E. Waller joined the staff to do a Saturday morning show from 10–11:00 and two more weekend shows were added. The "Holy Hip-Hop Show" was added on Saturdays from 7–9pm and a Christian dating show was added on Sundays from 9–11pm.

WPPZ's staff includes Lonnie Hunter, Brother Marcus, and CeCe Magee. Former DJs include Church Lady (2007–2008), Ed Long (2005–2007), CoCo Brother (2011–2013), and Les Brown and B.I.G. C.I.T.Y. (2008–2009; 2009–present).

2016-2019: Classic hip-hop
On September 27, 2016, at midnight, WPPZ and WPHI swapped frequencies, with "Praise" moving to 107.9 FM, and "Boom" moving to 103.9 FM. It also marked the return of the WPHI call letters to the frequency that originated the call letters.  With the change, WPHI's classic hip hop format shifted to urban contemporary; the classic hip hop songs were reduced to just a few per hour, with the station now emphasizing currents and recurrents. This marks the fourth attempt by Radio One to compete against long dominant WUSL.

Eight months after WPHI's format switch, WISX flipped to a classic hip hop-leaning rhythmic AC on June 30, 2017.

2019-2021: Rhythmic contemporary
On December 24, 2019, WPHI rebranded as "Hip Hop 103.9".

2021-present: All news simulcast
On November 5, 2020, Urban One announced that it would swap WPHI-FM, WHHL and the intellectual property of WFUN-FM in St. Louis, and WTEM in Washington, D.C. to Entercom, in exchange for WBT/WBT-FM, WFNZ and WLNK in Charlotte, North Carolina. Under the terms of the deal, Entercom would take over operations of WPHI-FM under a local marketing agreement (LMA) on November 23, and flip it to a simulcast of KYW. Ahead of the change, the "Hip Hop" format and branding moved to WRNB on November 16, and the two stations simulcast for a week.  The change in ownership and format took place at midnight on the 23rd. The swap was consummated on April 20, 2021. The WPHI call letters were retained.

On March 30, 2021, Entercom rebranded to the corporate name "Audacy."  KYW and WPHI-FM programming is found on the Audacy.com website and app.

See also
WLIR — the original "WDRE" from 1987 to 1996, at 92.7 FM in Garden City, New York
WXPN-HD2

References

External links

WDRE era

 "103.9 WDRE Philadelphia, The Birth 1992" — studio footage of "WIBF" format to "WDRE" format switch at midnight; press parties, including a press event with Joey Ramone; photos of staff and guests
WDRE Reunion — articles and footage about WDRE on the University of Pennsylvania WXPN website
WDRE 103.9 FM — archived copy of the original WDRE website
 — follow-up on WDRE popularity after end of format
 — short letter to the editor with WDRE end date given
Philadelphia FM Radio History — timeline of 103.9 
103.9 WDRE...Philly's Modern Rock — page on Angelfire, with DJ locations

Radio stations established in 1960
Audacy, Inc. radio stations
PHI-FM
1960 establishments in Pennsylvania
All-news radio stations in the United States